
Gmina Mokobody is a rural gmina (administrative district) in Siedlce County, Masovian Voivodeship, in east-central Poland. Its seat is the village of Mokobody, which lies approximately 16 kilometres (10 mi) north-west of Siedlce and 75 km (46 mi) east of Warsaw.

Villages
Gmina Mokobody contains the villages and settlements of Bale, Dąbrowa, Jeruzale, Kapuściaki, Kisielany-Kuce, Kisielany-Żmichy, Księżpole-Jałmużny, Księżpole-Smolaki, Męczyn, Męczyn-Kolonia, Mokobody, Mokobody-Kolonia, Niwiski, Osiny Dolne, Osiny Górne, Pieńki, Skupie, Świniary, Wesoła, Wólka Proszewska, Wólka Żukowska, Wyłazy, Zaliwie-Brzozówka, Zaliwie-Piegawki, Zaliwie-Szpinki, Zemły, Ziomaki and Żuków.

Neighbouring gminas
Gmina Mokobody is bordered by the gminas of Bielany, Grębków, Kotuń, Liw, Siedlce, and Suchożebry.

References

Polish official population figures 2006

Mokobody
Siedlce County